Because Mommy Works is a 1994 television film directed by Robert Markowitz. It is about Abby (Anne Archer) who fights with Ted Forman (John Heard) for the custody of their son Willie Forman (Casey Wurzbach). The action takes place in California.

The film confronts the issue of women being denied custody rights during divorce partly or solely because they work at jobs outside the home, allegedly making them less available as maternal caregivers. It focuses in particular on the added custodial challenge that working women face if their former husband has remarried a woman who does not have a job.

The film was inspired by a true story that appeared in McCall's Magazine in 1992, "Why a Good Mother Lost Custody of her Child," by author Cameron Stauth. The article was about a custody case in Eugene, Oregon, that involved a female teacher who lost custody of her young son, primarily because her husband had remarried a woman who did not work outside the home. Stauth co-produced the film with Anne Archer, and it was written by writer/director Lynn Mamet, sister of writer/director David Mamet.

The issue of working mothers being penalized in custody cases is still being debated in the courts, and is the subject of heated debate among women's rights advocates.

References

External links
 

1994 films
1994 drama films
1994 television films
American drama television films
Films directed by Robert Markowitz
Films set in California
1990s American films